Highland Township is the name of some places in the U.S. state of Michigan:

 Highland Township, Oakland County, Michigan
 Highland Township, Osceola County, Michigan

Michigan township disambiguation pages